William Hughes  (1865 – 14 November 1919) was a Welsh international footballer. He was part of the Wales national football team between 1891 and 1892, playing 3 matches. He played his first match on 7 March 1891 against England and his last match on 26 March 1892 against Scotland.  He played his club football for Bootle, where he was an ever-present in the club's first season in the Football League, making 22 appearances.  At the end of the 1892–93 season, however, Bootle resigned from the league.  He subsequently joined Liverpool.  An obituary described him as "one of the best centre half-backs that Bootle boasted".

After his playing career ended, he worked as a steward for the White Star Company.  He died in a motorcycle accident in November 1919.

See also
 List of Wales international footballers (alphabetical)

References

1865 births
1919 deaths
People from Caernarfon
Sportspeople from Gwynedd
Welsh footballers
Wales international footballers
Association football defenders
Bootle F.C. (1879) players
Liverpool F.C. players
Motorcycle road incident deaths
Road incident deaths in Wales